Carlo Belli (1742-1816) was an Italian poet and translator of contemporary German works.

He was born in Venice. He had become a Jesuit priest, but left the order when it was suppressed in 1773. Among his publications were:
Della Messiade (1774), translated from the work in German of Der Messias by Friedrich Gottlieb Klopstok 
La quattro parti del giorno (1778), translated from the work in German of Der Messias by Justus Friedrich Wilhelm Zachariae 
Il Ventaglio (1782)
Gli Ucelli, ejemplare alle cura materna, stanze morali (1817)

References

1742 births
1816 deaths
18th-century Italian writers
18th-century Italian male writers
Italian translators
Writers from Venice
Date of birth unknown
Date of death missing
People from Venice
18th-century Italian Jesuits